Vincent Valera Bourke (born 14 September 1933) is a former  Australian rules footballer who played with North Melbourne in the Victorian Football League (VFL).

Bourke, originally from Henty, was signed by North Melbourne in 1954.

Notes

External links 

Living people
1933 births
Australian rules footballers from New South Wales
North Melbourne Football Club players
North Albury Football Club players